Goodmayes is a district of Ilford in the London Borough of Redbridge, England. It is situated eleven miles north-east of Charing Cross, and forms part of both the Romford and Ilford post towns. Historically part of Essex, it was part of the Municipal Borough of Ilford until 1965 when it was incorporated into Greater London.

History
The name Goodmayes and Goodmaistrete is recorded in 1456, and the name is likely to be associated with the family of John Godemay who was referred to in a document of 1319. A farm called Goodmath is recorded on the Chapman and Andre 1 inch to one mile map of Essex from 1777. Barley Lane is believed to be named after Dorothy Barley, the sister of Henry Barley, Dorothy was the last Abbess of nearby Barking Abbey (elected 1527).  

Goodmayes was part of the Chadwell ward of the ancient parish of Barking, Essex. In 1888 the Chadwell and Great Ilford wards of Barking became a new parish of Ilford. This became Ilford Urban District in 1894 and was the Municipal Borough of Ilford from 1926 to 1965. The London Borough of Redbridge was formed in 1965 from Ilford and other areas.

Goodmayes was largely undeveloped until the end of the 19th century, when large scale suburban development took place as London expanded. Most of the area here and in neighbouring Seven Kings was only built up between 1898 and 1910 by the developer A. C. Corbett who used new stations on the Great Eastern Railway to promote the new suburbs. Goodmayes station was built in 1901. Since then, little has changed in the area and the lines of Edwardian terraced housing continue to dominate the area with relatively few more recent additions.

Former extensive railway sidings near Goodmayes Station were closed in the 1970s and later redeveloped for retail purposes. A large Tesco store and a branch of Wickes now occupy the site.

Facilities

Goodmayes Park, an area of open space containing a lake, basketball and tennis courts, is located here. It once contained a bandstand and a boathouse but these are no longer available. Another local park is named Barley Lane Park.

On Barley Lane, Brookside is based. Brookside is, according to 'the quality network for inpatient CAMHS services' (QNIC), an adolescent unit that provides a high standard of care. Brookside comprises Brookside Main, Interact Outreach service and the Brookside High Dependency Unit.

Barley Lane Primary school is a school located on the Barley Lane road.

Local media
Bedrock Radio is a charity-run community health and hospital radio station with studios located within the grounds of Goodmayes Hospital.

The first Hospital Radio service In Ilford began broadcasting in 1975 as Goodmayes Hospital Radio Association . 
Today, Bedrock Radio serves the community by broadcasting online and to Goodmayes, King Georges & Queen's Hospitals and features information about the Hospitals and NHS services, promotes charitable and community organisations and has an extensive local events guide featuring community non-profit events.

Nearest places
 Ilford
 Becontree
 Dagenham
 Chadwell Heath
 Seven Kings
Chigwell Row
 Collier Row

Location

Transport
Goodmayes railway station is served by the Elizabeth line, which took over the station from TFL Rail in May 2022, with trains to/from London Liverpool Street. Services will be extended  through central London to Heathrow Airport and Reading, but as of 2022 this stage of the project is delayed. Additional East London Transit route EL3 to Barking Riverside has served the station and surrounding area since February 2017.

The nearest London Underground stations are Barking on the District and Hammersmith & City lines, and Newbury Park on the Central line.

Notable natives
Actor Cardew Robinson was born in Goodmayes on 14 August 1917. He is best remembered for character and cameo roles, the best known being the fakir in 'Carry-On Up the Khyber'. He died at Roehampton in 1992.

Actor Sir Ian Holm was born at Goodmayes Hospital on 12 September 1931, to Scottish parents, Jean Wilson Holm and James Harvey Cuthbert. His mother was a nurse and his father was a psychiatrist and superintendent of the West Ham Corporation Mental Hospital as Goodmayes Hospital was then known. Cuthbert was one of the pioneers of electric shock therapy for treating mental illness. Ian Holm was created a CBE in 1989 and was knighted in 1998.

Local Scout groups
Goodmayes is home to various local Scout groups, most notably 4th Goodmayes, who are located on Barley Lane next to St Pauls Church. Established for 90 years, their home is traditionally called the Gaffery, which has had many different buildings in the past but they have remained on the same site. The group's current home is incorporated within the St Paul's Community Centre, which opened in 2005.
Ages start from 6 up to 14, with the three sections called the Beavers, the Cubs and the Scouts.
In 2010, they opened up their own Explorer Unit for 14- to 18-year-olds and incorporated it into a Young Leader Scheme, providing trained and qualified young leaders for other Scouting sections to assist their leaders.

7th Goodmayes scout group was established in 2006 and has over 100 members. It is the first scout group in East London to be run by Muslims. It has accomplished many tasks and activities, including visiting the House of Lords, Buckingham Palace, and partaking in numerous water sports activities including rafting, sailing, kayaking and canoeing. The group also aims to contribute to the community through activities such as tree planting and a sponsored walk for Comic Relief, raising over 1000 pounds.
Other activities include archery, wall climbing, camping, etc.

References

External links 
 Goodmayes Hospital - History & Photographs

Areas of London
Districts of the London Borough of Redbridge